Thomas Herier, Erier, Erriers, or Erars (fl. 1240–1270) was a Picard trouvère associated with the "Arras school".

Herier is not mentioned in contemporary documents and all that is known about him is derived from his works. He composed a jeu parti with Gillebert de Berneville and possibly another with Guillaume le Vinier. He addressed one poem to "Jakemon of Cyson" (Jacques de Cysoing) and another to a Trésorier, probably either the Trésorier de Lille or the Trésorier d'Aire. His relation to Arras is established by his references to a local banker, Audefroi Louchart, and the local sheriff, Mikiel le Waisdier. He also mentions in his poems Jeanne, Countess of Ponthieu, and the Sire du Roeulx (Rués).

According to Theodore Karp, "Herier's poetry displays a certain elegance, but is commonplace in thought and imagery." His poems are heptasyllabic with the exception of the decasyllabic Mais n'os chanter and generally isometric. All his melodies are in bar form save for the descort Un descort vaurai retraire. None of them survive in mensural notation. Karp considers Bien me sui aperceus and Ja ne lairai mon usage to be more ornate than the others.

Extant works with melodies
Ainc mais nul jour ne chantai
Bien me sui aperceus
Deus, com est a grant doulour
Helas, je me sui donés
Ja ne lairai mon usage
Mais n'os chanter de fueille ne de flours
Nus ne set les maus d'amours
Onc ne sorent mon pensé
Quant la froidure est partie
Quant voi le tens repairier
Tant ai amé et proié
Un descort vaurai retraire

References
Karp, Theodore. "Herier, Thomas." Grove Music Online. Oxford Music Online. Accessed 14 September 2008.

Trouvères
Male classical composers